Pure is the sixth studio album by Maksim Mrvica.  It was internationally released by MBO on 22 November 2007.

Track listing
 "Dies Irae" (Giuseppe Verdi)
 "Hall Of The Mountain King" (Edvard Grieg)
 "Exodus" (Ernest Gold)
 "Croatian Rhapsody" (Tonči Huljić)
 "Passionata" (Tonči Huljić)
 "Somewhere in Time" (John Barry)
 "Yellow River" (Xian Xinghai)
 "Cubana" (Tonči Huljić)
 "Claudine" (Tonči Huljić)
 "New World Concerto" (Antonn Dvořk)
 "Poseidon's Tale" (Tonči Huljić)
 "Child In Paradise" (Tonči Huljić)
 "Flight Of The Bumble-bee" (Rimsky-Korsakov)

See also
Pure II

References

External links
Maksim "Pure"
Toshiba-EMI Maksim's Japan site

2007 albums
Maksim Mrvica albums
Classical crossover albums